Bustan HaGalil ( or בוסתן הגליל lit. Orchard of the Galilee) is a moshav in the Western Galilee in northern Israel. Located near Acre, it falls under the jurisdiction of Mateh Asher Regional Council.

History
It was founded in 1948 by Holocaust survivors from Romania and was located on the land of the depopulated Palestinian village of Al-Manshiyya, north of the village site. The site had previously been used for the Sydney Smith Barracks, where the Armistice of Saint Jean d'Acre, which ended the Syria-Lebanon campaign of World War II in 1941, was signed.
 The name is symbolic, taken after the orchards in the area. 

After the 1948 Arab–Israeli War, residents of the moshav of Beit Yosef joined them.

References

External links
Bustan HaGalil Authority for Development of the Galilee 
  

Moshavim
Populated places in Northern District (Israel)
Romanian-Jewish culture in Israel
Populated places established in 1948
1948 establishments in Israel